In Good Company may refer to:

Film and TV 
In Good Company (TV series), a Canadian television series hosted by Hana Gartner
In Good Company (2000 film), a Greek film directed by Nikos Zapatinas 
In Good Company (2004 film), an American comedy-drama film written and directed by Paul Weitz

Music
In Good Company (Ted Brown album), 1985
In Good Company (Kevin Crawford album), 2001
In Good Company (Canadian Chamber Choir album), 2010
In Good Company (George Cables album), 2015

See also
Good Company (disambiguation)